Doublecortin like kinase 3 is a protein that in humans is encoded by the DCLK3 gene.

References

Further reading 

Human proteins